Miles F. Hatch (April 1847 – January 21, 1919) was an American politician in the state of Washington. He served in the Washington House of Representatives from 1895 to 1897.

References

1847 births
1919 deaths
Republican Party members of the Washington House of Representatives
People from McHenry County, Illinois
19th-century American politicians